HMS Porcupine was a  of the Royal Navy.  She was launched by Palmers Shipbuilding and Iron Company in 1895, served in home waters and was in service during the First World War.

Design and construction
Three torpedo-boat destroyers were ordered on 7 November 1893 from the Jarrow shipbuilders, Palmers Shipbuilding and Iron Company for the Royal Navy as part of the 1893–1894 Naval Estimates. These three ships,  and Porcupine were part of a larger group of 36 destroyers ordered as part of this shipbuilding programme, as a follow-on to the six prototype "26-knotters" ordered in the previous 1892–1893 estimates.

Displacement was  light and  full load. Three funnels were fitted. Armament consisted of a single QF 12 pounder 12 cwt gun and three 6-pounder guns, with two 18 inch (450 mm) torpedo tubes. One of the torpedo tubes could be removed to accommodate a further two six-pounders, although the Palmer 27-knotters later carried both the two torpedo tubes and all 5 six-pounder guns.

Porcupine, together with the other two Palmer-built destroyers, was laid down on 28 March 1894. She was launched on 19 September 1895. Porcupine reached a speed of  during sea trials, exceeding the required 27 knots. She was completed in March 1896.

Service history
In 1896 Porcupine was in reserve at Chatham. She took part in the 1896 British Naval Manoeuvres, attached to the Channel Fleet operation from Milford Haven. Porcupine undertook a refit at Chatham in late 1899, and was passed into the Fleet Reserve 15 January 1900. The following month she succeeded HMS Cygnet as part of the Medway Instructional Flotilla, taking the latter ship's crew, including Commander Cecil Hickley in command. Lieutenant George Geoffrey Codrington was appointed in command in January 1902, and she paid off at Chatham on 31 July 1902, following which she had her boilers retubed. She took part in the fleet review held at Spithead on 16 August 1902 for the coronation of King Edward VII. In 1910, Porcupine was part of the Sixth Destroyer Flotilla, based at The Nore, still being based at the Nore in 1912. Porcupine ran aground off Clacton on 18 October 1910. Her commanding officer was reprimanded in the resulting Court Martial. On 30 August 1912 the Admiralty directed all destroyers were to be grouped into classes designated by letters based on contract speed and appearance. After 30 September 1913, as a 27-knotter, Porcupine  was assigned to the A class.

By February 1913, Porcupine was not part of an active flotilla, but was attached as a tender to the torpedo school at Chatham, with a nucleus crew, although she was in full commission by May 1913. She remained part of the torpedo school based at Chatham on the eve of the outbreak of the First World War.

Porcupine joined the Local Defence Flotilla at the Nore on the outbreak of war, and remained part of that formation for much of the rest of the war, still being a member in November 1917.

Porcupine was sold to the ship breakers Thos. W. Ward on 29 April 1920 for scrapping.

Notes

References

Bibliography
 
 
 
 
 
 
 
 
 

 

Janus-class destroyers
Ships built on the River Tyne
1895 ships